The 2005–06 First Women's Basketball League of Serbia and Montenegro is the 4th season of the First Women's Basketball League of Serbia and Montenegro, the highest professional basketball league in Serbia and Montenegro. It is also 62nd national championship played by Serbian clubs inclusive of nation's previous incarnations as Yugoslavia.

The first half of the season consists of 11 teams and 110-game regular season (20 games for each of the 11 teams) and in second half of the season 30-game in Super league and 8 in playoff.

Regular season
The League of the season was played with 11 teams and play a dual circuit system, each with each one game at home and away. The six best teams at the end of the regular season were placed in the Super League. The regular season began on 13 October 2005 and it will end on 19 March 2006.

Standings

Super League
The Super League of the season was played with 6 teams and play a dual circuit system, each with each one game at home and away. The four best teams at the end of the regular Super League placed in the Play Off. The regular season began on 5 April 2006 and it will end on 10 May 2006.

Play Off
Play Off is played according to the cup system. Champion is received after the final was played. In the semifinals was played on 2 wins, in the Final at 3 wins. Play Off is played from 15 May 2006. to 2 June 2006.

Bracket

References

External links
regular season at srbijasport.net
Super League at srbijasport.net
Play off at srbijasport.net

Serbia and Montenegro
2005–06 in Serbian basketball
2005 in Montenegrin sport
2006 in Montenegrin sport
First Women's Basketball League of Serbia seasons